Eritha (in Linear B script: E-ri-ta, 13th–12th century BC) was a Mycenaean Greek priestess. She was one of the most significant priestesses in the Mycenaean state of Pylos, in southwestern Peloponnese. Eritha was in charge of a sanctuary dedicated to the goddess Potnia. She was also involved in a dispute with the local authorities over the taxable assets of the sanctuary.

Position in society
In the Mycenaean era, priestesses from Pylos in general controlled land, textiles, as well as male and female personnel. According to the circa 1200 BC records found in the palace of Pylos, Eritha had enough power and appears to have been one of the most significant priestesses in the region. Together with another local priestess, Karpathia, she appears to be of high status in Mycenaean society, probably the same status female clergy enjoyed in Minoan Crete.

Eritha controlled a considerable amount of land and was assisted in her service by sacred servants. She was a priestess of the female divinity Potnia and was in charge of a sanctuary in the area of pa-ki-ja-ne. The latter toponym appears to be located in modern Sphagianes, near Pylos. Eritha, as a representative of this religious institution also appears to be responsible for the economic resources of the sanctuary.

Dispute with the local authorities
Eritha was involved in a dispute with the local communal authorities of Pylos (the damos) due to the legal status of her religious holdings. She claimed that the land of the sanctuary should be exempted from paying taxes. Eritha probably asserted her claim on behalf of the goddess Potnia. Thus, according to her, the land of the sanctuary should have been classified as a privileged one, presumably free of obligations, rather than a regular leasehold subject to taxes. The preserved records in Pylos don't mention the outcome of this dispute. It appears that Eritha's case remained unresolved by the local authorities due to the fact that Pylos and its palace was burnt to the ground by unidentified invaders in the early 12th century BC.

See also
Mycenaean religion

References

Citations

Sources

Ancient Greek priestesses
Ancient Messenians
Mycenaean Greeks
13th-century BC clergy
12th-century BC clergy
12th-century BC women